Founded in 1867 in Glasgow, Queen's Park F.C. had a pivotal role in the development and expansion of the game of association football in the 19th century. Among other achievements, 76 of the club's players were selected for the Scotland national football team, with 252 appearances in total, between 1872 and 1946 (the majority coming before 1900).

Background

1870s
Queen's Park won the first three Scottish Cup competitions in the 1870s, reached the final of the English FA Cup twice in the 1880s and introduced several innovations in playing tactics and stadium procedures. Their contribution to the Scotland national football team was fundamental: all 11 players who appeared for the home side in the 1872 Scotland v England football match were officially representatives of the club (although some are known to have had strong links to other teams). The Spiders provided the majority of the Scotland team for the next two decades, particularly in the most important annual fixture against England. Scotland played without Queen's Park representation for the first time in 1885, but this was an anomaly: the club needed their players for an FA Cup semi-final against Nottingham Forest, and their absence was not felt – the 'weaker' Scotland team defeated Ireland 8–2.

1880s and 1890s

As football increased in popularity across Britain, talented Scottish players were regularly enticed to English clubs with unofficial financial inducements, which the Scottish Football Association and its members in general, and the Queen's Park club in particular, railed against, insisting that the sport was to be enjoyed by gentlemen for recreation on an amateur basis. This stance meant that when professionalism was legalised in England in the mid-1880s, Scottish teams withdraw from the FA Cup and the SFA ignored the 'mercenary' Scotch professors employed over the border, selecting only home-based players, a practice which continued even after the introduction of the Scottish Football League in 1890 (two years after England's Football League began); as standard-bearers of the amateur ethos, Queen's Park refused to join the league as they felt it would lead to professionalism among the larger clubs pursuing success which would lead to the demise of smaller provincial teams (also, it has been reported, weakening their own commercial appeal in playing occasional lucrative exhibition matches around the country). In this period the club had its only active international player from outwith Scotland: Humphrey Jones was already captain of the Wales team when he moved to Scotland in 1887 to work as a teacher, and gained his last two caps while registered as a Queen's Park player (he also turned out for East Stirlingshire and for other teams in England and Wales when circumstances allowed, with his amateur status meaning he was not tied to any one club).

While the effects of wider professionalism in England were not immediate – Scotland continued to post strong results throughout the first decade of the British Home Championship which began in 1883–84 – gradually the economic and physical benefits of the more organised English system became clear, and with 'shamateurism' already rife in Scotland, professionalism was legalised in the SFL in 1893 and the better-supported clubs, including Queen's Park's city rivals Celtic and Rangers, could now compete with English clubs in recruiting and retaining the best talent. English-based players were admitted to the Scotland team in 1896 to arrest their larger rival's increasing dominance of the Home Championship, and Spiders representatives became increasingly rare.

Early 20th century

By the end of the 19th century Queen's Park had been displaced as the country's leading club; the divide in quality with the bigger professional clubs was initially not so wide that they could not still compete to some extent, but they never challenged for the Scottish League championship after belatedly joining the competition in 1900. The 1901–02 season was the first in which no Queen's Park player was involved in any of the three international fixtures, and tellingly the first time that none played in the prestige England match. the Spiders were relegated from the top division in 1922, though quickly regained their place in the top division and held it until 1948, after which they were largely a lower-tier club. With an unremarkable status as a league member, they provided only 14 different players to the Scottish League XI (ranking 16th in this respect), and only 12 of the club's players with over 100 appearances also gained a Scotland cap while at the club, with the vast majority of internationals being from the earlier era when only a small number of official cup fixtures were played each season. Instead, as they battled to compete at a high level with limited resources, the club became the main provider to the Scotland national amateur football team which was active from the 1920s to the 1970s – several of those players also represented Great Britain in Olympic football. In the 1930s, Mustafa Mansour, an Egyptian international goalkeeper, played for Queen's Park after moving to Glasgow to study, but it appears he was not capped during his time at the club.

Of the club's 76 different internationals (still the fourth-highest ranking club in this regard, while 89 goals were scored – 3rd overall – and 252 total appearances made – 10th overall), only 18 of those men made their debut in the 20th century (eight after the end of the First World War), itself a notable achievement for an amateur to be selected in an environment dominated by professionals. The final cap gained by a Queen's Park player was for Bobby Brown in 1946, but this itself was an outlier – more regular representation had ended when Bob Gillespie and James Crawford both won their last cap in a win over England in 1933. The final goal was scored by Alan Morton in 1920.

Late 20th and early 21st century
Despite their diminished status in the game as a result of the commitment to amateurism (a status which was ended in 2019 following a vote by club members), the club has continued to act as a stepping stone to several players who reached international status later in their career, including Sammy Cox, George Herd, Ronnie Simpson, John Little, Bobby Clark, David Holt, Alex Ferguson and Jamie Paton (for Australia) in the late 20th century, and Malky Mackay, Paul Paton (for Northern Ireland), Barry Douglas, Lawrence Shankland, Andy Robertson and Paul McGinn in the early 21st century – the last three played together at Hampden in the fourth tier during the 2012–13 season, with Robertson going on to become the national team captain, as well as gaining the most caps of any former Spiders player (55 as of the end of 2021) and the first club graduate to win the English league championship. Modern-era internationals who played for Queen's Park at youth level include Derek Parlane, Simon Donnelly, Aiden McGeady (93 caps for Ireland) and Steven Saunders.

In Women's football which became more organised in the 1990s, Queen's Park F.C. (women) has never been among the major Scottish clubs although they were a SWPL member. Detailed records are not widely available before the 2010s, although Megan Sneddon, Amy McDonald and Jen Beattie are known to have played for the club and the national team shortly prior to the section was disbanded in 2008, relaunching two years later at a lower level. Since then, Ho Wan Tung has featured for Hong Kong.

List of players

Notes

References

Queen's Park F.C. players
Queen's Park F.C. international
Association football player non-biographical articles
Internationals
International
Queen's Park